KFOI (90.9 FM) is a radio station broadcasting a Variety format. Licensed to Red Bluff, KFOI serves the Redding and Red Bluff areas in Northern California.

External links
KFOI official website

FOI